Beira railway station is the principal railway station and important landmark in Beira, Mozambique.

History 
The modernist railway station is part of the legacy of Portuguese colonialism in Mozambique. Constructed between 1958 and 1966 by the trio of architects João Garizo de Carmo, Paulo de Melo Sampaio and Francisco José Castro.

References 

1966 establishments in Mozambique
Modernist architecture in Mozambique
Buildings and structures in Beira, Mozambique
Railway stations opened in 1966
Railway stations in Mozambique
Portuguese colonial architecture in Mozambique